Baden was an Imperial Estate of the Holy Roman Empire and later one of the German states along the frontier with France, primarily consisting of territory along the right bank of the Rhine, opposite Alsace and the Palatinate.

History
The territory evolved out of the Breisgau, an early medieval county in the Duchy of Swabia. A continuous sequence of counts is known since 962; the counts belong to the House of Zähringen. In 1061, the counts first acquired the additional title of Margrave of Verona. Even though they lost the March of Verona soon thereafter, they kept the title of margrave. In 1112, the title of Margrave of Baden was first used.

For most of the early modern period, the Margraviate of Baden was divided into two parts, one ruled by the Catholic Margraves of Baden-Baden, and the other by the Protestant Margraves of Baden-Durlach. In 1771, the main Baden-Baden line became extinct, and all of the Baden lands came under the rule of the Baden-Durlach line. The reunited margraviate existed until 1803.

During the Napoleonic era, in the imperial reorganisation of 1803, Baden gained a great deal of additional territory, and its ruler was promoted to become one of the few prince-electors of the Holy Roman Empire. However, this situation lasted only for three years until the crushing Battle of Austerlitz at the hands of Napoleon's armies, which caused the Holy Roman Empire to be declared dissolved eight months later, in August 1806. 

By definition the Electorate of Baden then ceased to exist as such. Just as the former Holy Roman Emperor now assumed the title of Emperor of Austria, so the ruler of Baden assumed that of Grand Duke of Baden. The Grand Duchy of Baden, with increased additional territory, continued in existence approximately within its 1806 borders until the fall of the German monarchies in 1918, when it became the Republic of Baden.

Counts in Breisgau 
 Berthold I, before 962–982
 Berthold II, 982–1005/06
 Berthold III, 1005/06–1024
 Berthold IV, 1024–1073
 Herman I of Baden, 1040–1074

The Margraviate of Baden

During the 11th century, the Duchy of Swabia lacked a powerful central authority and was under the control of various comital dynasties, the strongest of them being the House of Hohenstaufen, the House of Welf, the Habsburgs and the House of Zähringen. Emperor Henry III had promised the ducal throne to the Zähringen scion Berthold, however, upon Henry's death in 1056, his widow Agnes of Poitou appointed Rudolf of Rheinfelden as Duke of Swabia. Berthold renounced his rights and was compensated with the Duchy of Carinthia and the March of Verona in Italy. Not able to establish himself, he finally lost both territories, when he was deposed by King Henry IV of Germany during the Investiture Controversy in 1077. Berthold retired to his Swabian home territory, where he died the next year. The Veronese margravial title was nevertheless retained by his eldest son, Herman I.

Herman II, son of Herman I and grandson of Berthold, had concluded an agreement with the rival Hohenstaufen dynasty, and about 1098 was enfeoffed with immediate territory by Emperor Henry IV. He chose to establish his residence in Germany, as he had been born and raised there. His lordship of choice was Baden (present-day Baden-Baden), where his father had gained the right to rule by marrying the heiress, Judit von Backnang-Sulichgau, Countess of Eberstein-Calw. In Baden, Herman II had Hohenbaden Castle built. Construction began about 1100, and when it was completed in 1112, he marked the occasion by adopting the title of Margrave of Baden.

House of Zähringen

Partitions of Baden under Zähringen rule

Table of monarchs
(Note: Between 1190 and 1515 there were three main numberings of monarchs in Baden: the Baden numbering, valid for all divisions of Baden with exception of Hachberg; the Hachberg numbering, valid in the namesake territory; and the Hachberg-Sausenberg, division of the previous, which also adopted an independent numbering for its monarchs. With the reunion of Baden in 1503, Baden original numbering ended up prevailing over the others.)

Elector of Baden, 1803–1806

Grand Dukes of Baden, 1806–1918

See also 
 List of Ministers-President of Baden-Württemberg#Presidents of the Republic of Baden (1918–1945)
 House of Zähringen
 History of Baden-Württemberg
 Coat of arms of Baden

References 

Rulers of Baden
Baden
Baden rulers
History of Baden